André Léon Blum (9 April 1872 – 30 March 1950) was a French socialist politician and three-time Prime Minister.

As a Jew, he was heavily influenced by the Dreyfus affair of the late 19th century. He was a disciple of French Socialist leader Jean Jaurès and after Jaurès' assassination in 1914, became his successor. 

Despite his relatively short tenures, his time in office was very influential: as Prime Minister in the left-wing Popular Front government in 1936–37, he provided a series of major economic and social reforms. Blum declared neutrality in the Spanish Civil War (1936–1939) to avoid the civil conflict spilling over into France itself. Once out of office in 1938, he denounced the appeasement of Germany.

When Germany defeated France in 1940, he became a staunch opponent of Vichy France. Tried (but never judged) by the Vichy government on charges of treason, he was imprisoned in the Buchenwald concentration camp. After the war, he resumed a transitional leadership role in French politics, helping to bring about the French Fourth Republic, until his death in 1950.

Early life

Blum was born in 1872 in Paris to a moderately prosperous, middle class, assimilated Jewish family in the mercantile business. His father Abraham, a merchant, was born in Alsace. 

Blum entered the École Normale Supérieure in 1890 and excelled there, but he dropped out after a year later entering instead the Faculty of Law. He attended the University of Paris and became both a lawyer and literary critic.
Between 1905 and 1907 he wrote Du Mariage a highly controversial (for the period) and much talked about critical essay about traditional marriage as envisioned in the late 19th century with its religious and economic background and strong stress on women remaining virgins until their marriage day.

Blum stated that both men and women should enjoy a period of "polygamic" free sex life in order to experience a more mature and stable relationship during later married life.
Unsurprisingly he was targeted by the then-powerful Catholic Church in France, in the wake of the turmoil caused by the separation between church and state implemented by Emile Combes in 1905. Far right and royalist politicians and agitatators, and most preeminently Charles Maurras, were incensed, and pelted mostly anti-semitic insults and public outrage at Blum, famously dubbing him "le pornographe du Conseil d'état" as Blum was by then a counsellor of this institution. Although Blum's views being nowadays accepted and mostly mainstream in many developed countries, the book remained an object of scandal long after WWI and the shift to emancipation of women.

First political experiences

While in his youth an avid reader of the works of the nationalist writer Maurice Barrès, Blum had shown little interest in politics until the Dreyfus Affair of 1894, which had a traumatic effect on him as it did on many French Jews. Blum first became personally involved in the Affair when he aided the defense case of Émile Zola in 1898 as a jurist, before which he had not demonstrated interest in public affairs. Campaigning as a Dreyfusard brought him into contact with the socialist leader Jean Jaurès, whom he greatly admired. He began contributing to the socialist daily, L'Humanité, and joined the French Section of the Workers' International (SFIO). Soon he was the party's main theoretician. It is possible that Blum's interest in politics began somewhat earlier, as Fernand Gregh mentioned in his personal memoirs that Blum had expressed interest in politics as early as 1892.

In July 1914, just as the First World War broke out, Jaurès was assassinated, and Blum became more active in the Socialist party leadership. In August 1914 Blum became assistant to the Socialist Minister of Public Works Marcel Sembat. In 1919 he was chosen as chair of the party's executive committee, and was also elected to the National Assembly as a representative of Paris. Believing that there was no such thing as a "good dictatorship", he opposed participation in the Comintern. Therefore, in 1920, he worked to prevent a split between supporters and opponents of the Russian Revolution, but the radicals seceded, taking L'Humanité with them, and formed the SFIC.

Blum led the SFIO through the 1920s and 1930s, and was also editor of the party's newspaper, Le Populaire.

Popular Front government of 1936–1940 

Blum was elected as Deputy for Narbonne in 1929, and was re-elected in 1932 and 1936. In 1933, he expelled Marcel Déat, Pierre Renaudel, and other neosocialists from the SFIO. Political circumstances changed in 1934, when the rise of German dictator Adolf Hitler and fascist riots in Paris caused Stalin and the French Communists to change their policy. In 1935 all the parties of left and centre formed the Popular Front. France had not successfully recovered from the worldwide economic depression, wages had fallen and the working class demanded reforms. The Popular Front won a sweeping victory in June 1936. The Popular Front won a solid majority with 386 seats out of 608. For the first time, the Socialists won more seats than the Radicals; they formed an effective coalition. As Socialist leader Blum became Prime Minister of France and the first socialist to hold that office, he formed a cabinet that included 20 Socialists, 13 Radicals and two Socialist Republicans. The Communists won 15 percent of the vote, and 12 percent of the seats. They supported the government, although they refused to take any cabinet positions. For the first time, the cabinet included three women in minor roles, even though women were not able to vote.

Labour policies
The election of the left-wing government brought a wave of strikes, involving two million workers, and the seizure of many factories. The strikes were spontaneous and unorganised, but nevertheless the business community panicked and met secretly with Blum, who negotiated a series of reforms, and then gave labour unions the credit for the Matignon Accords. The new laws:
 gave workers the right to strike
 initiated collective bargaining
 legislated the mandating of 12 days of paid annual leave 
 legislated a 40-hour working week (outside of overtime)
 raised wages (15% for the lowest-paid workers, and 7% for the relatively well-paid)
 stipulated that employers would recognise shop stewards.
 ensured that there would be no retaliation against strikers.

The government legislated its promised reforms as rapidly as possible. On 11 June, the Chamber of Deputies voted for the forty-hour workweek, the restoration of civil servants' salaries, and two weeks' paid holidays, by a majority of 528 to 7. The Senate voted in favour of these laws within a week.

Blum persuaded the workers to accept pay raises and go back to work. Wages increased sharply; in two years the national average was up 48 percent. However inflation also rose 46%. The imposition of the 40-hour week proved highly inefficient, as industry had a difficult time adjusting to it. The economic confusion hindered the rearmament effort, and the rapid growth of German armaments alarmed Blum. He launched a major program to speed up arms production. The cost forced the abandonment of the social reform programmes that the Popular Front had counted heavily on.

Additional reforms
By mid-August 1936, the parliament had voted for:

 the creation of a national Office du blé (Grain Board or Wheat Office, through which the government helped to market agricultural produce at fair prices for farmers) to stabilise prices and curb speculation
 the nationalisation of the arms industries
 loans to small and medium-sized industries
 the raising of the compulsory school-attendance age to 14 years
 a major public works programme

It also raised the pay, pensions, and allowances of public-sector workers and ex-servicemen. The 1920 Sales Tax, opposed by the Left as a tax on consumers, was abolished and replaced by a production tax, which was considered to be a tax on the producer instead of the consumer.

Blum dissolved the far-right fascist leagues. In turn the Popular Front was actively fought by right-wing and far-right movements, which often used antisemitic slurs against Blum and other Jewish ministers. The Cagoule far-right group even staged bombings to disrupt the government.

Spanish Civil War

The Spanish Civil War broke out in July 1936 and deeply divided France. Blum adopted a policy of neutrality rather than assisting his ideological fellows, the Spanish Left-leaning Republicans. He acted from fear of splitting his domestic alliance with the centrist Radicals, or even precipitating an ideological civil war inside France. His refusal to send arms to Spain strained his alliance with the Communists, who followed Soviet policy and demanded all-out support for the Spanish Republic. The impossible dilemma caused by this issue led Blum to resign in June 1937. All the constituents of the French left supported the Republican government in Madrid, while the right supported the Nationalist insurgents. Blum's cabinet was deeply divided and he decided on a policy of non-intervention, and collaborated with Britain and 25 other countries to formalize an agreement against sending any munitions or volunteer soldiers to Spain. The Air Minister defied the cabinet and secretly sold warplanes to Madrid. Jackson concludes that the French government "was virtually paralyzed by the menace of civil war at home, the German danger abroad, and the weakness of her own defenses." The Republicans by 1938 were losing badly (they gave up in 1939), sending upwards of 500,000 political refugees across the border into France, where they were held in camps.

Attacks on Blum
On 13 February 1936, shortly before becoming Prime Minister, Blum was dragged from a car and almost beaten to death by the Camelots du Roi, a group of antisemites and royalists. The group's parent organisation, the right-wing Action Française league, was dissolved by the government following this incident, not long before the elections that brought Blum to power. Blum became the first socialist and the first Jew to serve as Prime Minister of France. As such he was an object of particular hatred from antisemitic elements.

In its short life, the Popular Front government passed important legislation, including the 40-hour week, 12 paid annual holidays for the workers, collective bargaining on wage claims, and the full nationalisation of the armament and military aviation industries. This latter sweeping action had the unanticipated effect of disrupting the production of armaments at the wrong time, only three years away from the beginning of war in September 1939. Blum also attempted to pass legislation extending the rights of the Arab population of Algeria, but this was blocked by "colons", colonist representatives in the Chamber and Senate.

Second government in 1938 and collapse
Blum was briefly Prime Minister again in March and April 1938, long enough to ship heavy artillery and other much needed military equipment to the Spanish Republicans. He was unable to establish a stable ministry; on 10 April 1938, his socialist government fell and he was removed from office.
 
In foreign policy, his government was torn between the traditional anti-militarism of the French Left and the urgency of the rising threat of Nazi Germany. The government cooperated with Britain and declared war on Germany when it invaded Poland in September 1939. Eight months of Phoney War thereafter, saw little or no movement. Suddenly in the spring of 1940, the Germans invaded France and defeated the French and British armies in a matter of weeks. The British Expeditionary Force evacuated from Dunkirk, taking many French soldiers along. France gave up, signing an armistice that gave Germany full control over much of France, with a rump Vichy government in control of the remainder as well as of the French colonial empire and the French Navy. The same Parliament that had sponsored the Popular Front program since 1936 remained in power; it voted overwhelmingly to make Marshal Philippe Pétain a dictator and reverse all of the gains of the French Third Republic.

Many historians judge the Popular Front a failure in terms of economics, foreign policy, and long-term stability. "Disappointment and failure," says Jackson, "was the legacy of the Popular Front." There is general agreement that at first it created enormous excitement and expectation on the left, but in the end it failed to live up to its promise.

Second World War

When the Germans occupied France in June 1940, Blum made no effort to leave the country, despite the extreme danger he was in as a Jew and a socialist leader; instead of fleeing the country, he escaped to southern France, but the French ordered his arrest. Blum was imprisoned in Fort du Portalet in the Pyrenees.

Blum was among "The Vichy 80", a minority of parliamentarians that refused to grant full powers to Marshal Pétain. He was arrested by the authorities in September and held until 1942, when he was put on trial in the Riom Trial on charges of treason, for having "weakened France's defenses" by ordering her arsenal shipped to Spain, leaving France's infantry unsupported by heavy artillery on the eastern front against Nazi Germany. He used the courtroom to make a "brilliant indictment" of the French military and pro-German politicians like Pierre Laval. The trial was such an embarrassment to the Vichy regime that the Germans ordered it called off, worried that Blum's expert performance would have major public consequences. He was transferred to German custody and imprisoned in Germany until 1945.

In April 1943, the occupying Government had Blum imprisoned in Buchenwald. As the war worsened for the Germans, they moved him into the section reserved for high-ranking prisoners, hoping that he might be used as a possible hostage for surrender negotiations. His future wife, Jeanne Adèle "Janot" Levylier, chose to come to the camp voluntarily to live with him inside the camp, and they were married there. As the Allied armies approached Buchenwald, he was transferred to Dachau, near Munich, and in late April 1945, together with other notable inmates, to Tyrol. In the last weeks of the war the Nazi regime gave orders that he was to be executed , but the local authorities decided not to obey them. Blum was rescued by Allied troops in May 1945. While in prison he wrote his best-known work, the essay  ("On a human scale").

His brother René, the founder of the Ballet de l'Opéra à Monte Carlo, was arrested in Paris in 1942. He was deported to Auschwitz, where, according to the Vrba-Wetzler report, he was tortured and killed in September 1942.

Post-war period

After the war, Léon Blum returned to politics, and was again briefly Prime Minister in the transitional postwar coalition government. He advocated an alliance between the center-left and the center-right parties in order to support the Fourth Republic against the Gaullists and the Communists. 

Although Blum's last government was very much an interim administration (lasting less than five weeks) it nevertheless succeeded in implementing a number of measures which helped to reduce the cost of living.
Blum also served as Vice-Premier for one month in the summer of 1948 in the very short-lived government led by André Marie.

Blum also served as an ambassador on a government loan mission to the United States, and as head of the French mission to UNESCO. He continued to write for Le Populaire until his death at Jouy-en-Josas, near Paris, on 30 March 1950. The kibbutz of Kfar Blum in northern Israel is named after him.

Government

First ministry (4 June 1936 – 22 June 1937)

Léon Blum – President of the Council
Édouard Daladier – Vice President of the Council and Minister of National Defense and War
Yvon Delbos – Minister of Foreign Affairs
Roger Salengro – Minister of the Interior
Vincent Auriol – Minister of Finance
Charles Spinasse – Minister of National Economy
Jean-Baptiste Lebas – Minister of Labour
Marc Rucart – Minister of Justice
Alphonse Gasnier-Duparc – Minister of Marine
Pierre Cot – Minister of Air
Jean Zay – Minister of National Education
Albert Rivière – Minister of Pensions
Georges Monnet – Minister of Agriculture
Marius Moutet – Minister of Colonies
Albert Bedouce – Minister of Public Works
Henri Sellier – Minister of Public Health
Robert Jardillier – Minister of Posts, Telegraphs, and Telephones
Paul Bastid – Minister of Commerce
Camille Chautemps – Minister of State
Paul Faure – Minister of State
Maurice Viollette – Minister of State
Léo Lagrange – Under-Secretary of State for the Organization of the leisure activities and sports -i.e. Minister for the Sports

Changes:
18 November 1936 – Marx Dormoy succeeds Roger Salengro as Minister of the Interior, following Salengro's suicide.

Second ministry (13 March – 10 April 1938)

Léon Blum – President of the Council and Minister of Treasury
Édouard Daladier – Vice President of the Council and Minister of National Defense and War
Joseph Paul-Boncour – Minister of Foreign Affairs
Marx Dormoy – Minister of the Interior
Charles Spinasse – Minister of Budget
Albert Sérol – Minister of Labour
Marc Rucart – Minister of Justice
César Campinchi – Minister of Military Marine
Guy La Chambre – Minister of Air
Jean Zay – Minister of National Education
Albert Rivière – Minister of Pensions
Georges Monnet – Minister of Agriculture
Marius Moutet – Minister of Colonies
Jules Moch – Minister of Public Works
Fernand Gentin – Minister of Public Health
Jean-Baptiste Lebas – Minister of Posts, Telegraphs, and Telephones
Ludovic-Oscar Frossard – Minister of Propaganda
Vincent Auriol – Minister of Coordination of Services of the Presidency of the Council
Pierre Cot – Minister of Commerce
Paul Faure – Minister of State
Théodore Steeg – Minister of State
Maurice Viollette – Minister of State
Albert Sarraut – Minister of State in charge of North African Affairs
Léo Lagrange – Under-Secretary of State for the Sports, the Leisure activities and the Physical Education

Third ministry (16 December 1946 – 22 January 1947)
Léon Blum – President of the Provisional Government and Minister of Foreign Affairs
André Le Troquer – Minister of National Defense
Édouard Depreux – Minister of the Interior
André Philip – Minister of Familial Economy and Finance
Robert Lacoste – Minister of Industrial Production
Daniel Mayer – Minister of Labour and Social Security
Paul Ramadier – Minister of Justice
Yves Tanguy – Minister of Public Utilities
Marcel Edmond Naegelen – Minister of National Education
 – Minister of Veterans and War Victims
François Tanguy-Prigent – Minister of Agriculture
Marius Moutet – Minister of Overseas France
Jules Moch – Minister of Public Works, Transport, Reconstruction, and Town Planning
 – Minister of Public Health and Population
Eugène Thomas – Minister of Posts
Félix Gouin – Minister of Planning
Guy Mollet – Minister of State
Augustin Laurent – Minister of State
Changes:
23 December 1946 – Augustin Laurent succeeds Moutet as Minister of Overseas France.

Books by Léon Blum
Nouvelles conversations de Goethe avec Eckermann, Éditions de la Revue blanche, 1901.
Du mariage, Paul Ollendorff, 1907; English translation, Marriage, J. B. Lippincott Company, 1937.
Stendhal et le beylisme, Paul Ollendorff, 1914.
Pour être socialiste, Libraire Populaire, 1920.
Bolchévisme et socialisme, Librairie populaire, 1927.
Souvenirs sur l'Affaire, Gallimard, 1935.
La Réforme gouvernementale, Bernard Grasset, 1936.
À l'échelle humaine, Gallimard, 1945; English translation, For All Mankind, Victor Gollancz, 1946 (Left Book Club).
L'Histoire jugera, Éditions de l'Arbre, 1943.
Le Dernier mois, Diderot, 1946.
Révolution socialiste ou révolution directoriale, J. Lefeuvre, 1947.
Discours politiques, Imprimerie Nationale, 1997.

References

Further reading
 ALQasear, Hussein Muhsin Hashim, and Azhar Kadhim Hasan. "The most important obstacles that led to the fall of the first Leon Blum government, 1937." Al-Qadisiyah Journal For Humanities Sciences 23.2 (2020): 264-285. online

 
 , new scholarly biography; excerpt; also see  online review
 Codding, George A., and William Safran. Ideology and politics: the Socialist Party of France (Routledge, 2019).

 , older scholarly biography 
 Colton, Joel. "Léon Blum and the French Socialists as a government party." Journal of Politics 15#4 (1953): 517–543. in JSTOR
 Colton, Joel. "Politics and Economics in the 1930s: The Balance Sheets of the 'Blum New Deal'." in From the Ancien Regime to the Popular Front, edited by Charles K. Warner (1969), pp. 181–208.

 Dalby, Louise Elliott. Leon Blum: Evolution of a Socialist (1963) online
 Halperin, S. William. "Léon Blum and contemporary French socialism." Journal of Modern History (1946): 241–250. in JSTOR
 Jackson, Julian. The popular Front in France: defending democracy, 1934–38 (Cambridge UP, 1990.)
 Jordan, Nicole. "Léon Blum and Czechoslovakia, 1936–1938." French History 5#1 (1991): 48–73. doi: 10.1093/fh/5.1.48
 
 Lacouture, Jean. Leon Blum (English edition 1982) online
 Marcus, John T. French Socialism in the Crisis Years, 1933–1936: Fascism and the French Left (1958) online
 Mitzman, Arthur. "The French Working Class and the Blum Government (1936–37)." International Review of Social History 9#3 (1964) pp: 363–390.
 Wall, Irwin M. "The Resignation of the First Popular Front Government of Leon Blum, June 1937." French Historical Studies (1970): 538–554. in JSTOR

External links

 Leon Blum Archive at marxists.org
 Maison de Léon et Jeanne Blum
 Cercle Léon Blum (in French)
 

|-

1872 births
1950 deaths
20th-century heads of state of France
Politicians from Paris
Jewish French politicians
20th-century French Jews
French Section of the Workers' International politicians
Heads of state of France
Prime Ministers of France
French Foreign Ministers
French Ministers of Finance
French socialists
Members of the 12th Chamber of Deputies of the French Third Republic
Members of the 13th Chamber of Deputies of the French Third Republic
Members of the 14th Chamber of Deputies of the French Third Republic
Members of the 15th Chamber of Deputies of the French Third Republic
Members of the 16th Chamber of Deputies of the French Third Republic
The Vichy 80
Human Rights League (France) members
Jewish socialists
Jewish prime ministers
Members of the Executive of the Labour and Socialist International
Lycée Henri-IV alumni
École Normale Supérieure alumni
Buchenwald concentration camp survivors
Dachau concentration camp survivors
Jewish anti-fascists
Dreyfusards